Alfred Delvau (1825 – May 3, 1867) was a French journalist and writer born in Paris.

Biography 

Alfred Delvau was the son of a master tanner from the Faubourg Saint-Marceau; he recounts his Parisian childhood in Au bord de la Bièvre : impressions and memories, published in 1854.

He began writing articles for La Réforme in 1846, for Le Triboulet in January 1848, and in the Journal pour Rire. He was the private secretary of Ledru-Rollin and, in 1848, founded L'Aimable faubourien. Diary of the rabble with Poulet-Malassis, his closest friend, and Antonio Watripon. The June 23, 1848, during the insurrections, the three had together came under fire at the barricades, atrue des Mathurins .

Delvau published a History of the February Revolution (1850) and collected The Revolutionary Walls (1851). During the interlude of the Second Republic,  Delvau wrote twice to the Minister of the Interior asking for help. Under the Second Empire , he earned his living by participating, in lexicographic work. He already joined the team of Maurice Lachâtre's Universal Dictionary in 1854.

He contributed to Le Figaro . He produced a Green Language Dictionary and an Erotic Dictionary , which led to legal proceedings.

He is the author of works on Paris and its history. He is one of the authors of the pastiche Le Parnassiculet contemporain  which mocks Parnassian poets .

Writings 

 Un mari au xviie siècle, 1845
 Grandeur et décadence des grisettes, comportant des dessins de sa composition gravé par F. Leblanc, 1848
 Ledru-Rollin : sa vie politique, 1848 Texte en ligne [archive]
 La Présidence s'il vous plaît ! par un républicain de la vieille, 1848 Texte en ligne [archive]
 À bas le suffrage universel ! 1850 Texte en ligne [archive]
 Histoire de la Révolution de Février, 1850 Texte en ligne [archive]
 Au bord de la Bièvre. Impressions et souvenirs, 1854 ; nouvelle édition, 1873, précédée d'une bibliographie des ouvrages de l'auteur ; Texte en ligne, 1873 [archive]
 Bibliothèque bleue : romans de chevalerie des XIIe, XIIIe, XIVe, XVe et XVIe siècles (1859-1860, plusieurs livraisons) Dirigé par Alfred Delvau. Réédité en 1869 sous le titre Collection des romans de chevalerie mis en prose française moderne
 « Bibliothèque franco-italienne » (1859) :
 G. Garibaldi. Vie et aventures 1807-1859
 Le Petit Caporal des zouaves
 Les Martyrs de l'Italie sous la domination autrichienne
 Histoire populaire de la campagne d'Italie
 Les Chimères, 1859
 Mémoires d'un vieux sou écrit avec Pierre Bry, 1859
 Les Dessous de Paris, avec frontispice de Léopold Flameng, 1860 Texte en ligne [archive], rééd. Éditions Lurlure, 2017
 Dictionnaire topographique, historique et étymologique des rues de Paris in Le Nouveau Paris, 1860
 Histoire anecdotique des Cafés et Cabarets de Paris, avec dessins et eaux-fortes de Gustave Courbet, Félicien Rops et Léopold Flameng, 1862
 Lettres de Junius, coups de plume sincères sur la littérature contemporaine, 1862 Texte en ligne [archive]
 Les Amours buissonnières, roman parisien, 1863
 Les Cythères parisiennes, histoire anecdotique des bals de Paris, avec vingt-quatre eaux-fortes et un frontispice de Félicien Rops et d'Émile Thérond, 1864
 Dictionnaire érotique moderne, avec frontispice de Félicien Rops 1864 Texte sur Wikisource
 Gérard de Nerval, sa vie et ses œuvres, avec eau-forte de G. Staal, 1865 Texte en ligne [archive]
 Mémoires d'une honnête fille, 1865
 Françoise, chapitre inédit de l'histoire des quatre sergents de La Rochelle, avec eau-forte d'Émile Thérond, 1865
 Histoire anecdotique des Barrières de Paris, avec 10 eaux-fortes d'Émile Thérond, 1865 Texte en ligne [archive]
 Le Fumier d'Ennius, avec frontispice de Léopold Flameng, 1865 Texte en ligne [archive]
 Dictionnaire de la langue verte. Argots parisiens comparés, 1866 Texte en ligne [archive]
 Le Grand et le petit trottoir, roman parisien, 1866
 Aucassin et Nicolette, roman de chevalerie provençal-picard, avec traduction par Alfred Delvau, 1866 Texte en ligne [archive]
 Les Heures parisiennes, avec vingt-cinq eaux-fortes d'Émile Bénassit, 1866 Texte en ligne [archive]
 Henry Murger et la Bohême, 1866 Texte en ligne [archive]
 Du Pont des Arts au Pont de Kehl (Reisebilder d'un Parisien), 1866 Texte en ligne [archive]
 Les Lions du jour, physionomies parisiennes, avec eaux-fortes de Félicien Rops, 1867 Texte en ligne [archive]
 Les Plaisirs de Paris, guide pratique et illustré, 1867 Texte en ligne [archive]
 Les Sonneurs de Sonnets 1540-1866, étude, 1867 Texte en ligne [archive]
 À la porte du paradis. Ma première leçon de boxe. Je me tuerai demain. Feu André-André. L'Héritier du mandarin, etc., 1867
 Collection des romans de chevalerie mis en prose française moderne, 2 vol., 1869 Réédition de Bibliothèque bleue : romans de chevalerie des XIIe, XIIIe, XIVe, XVe et XVIe siècles, paru en 1859-1860
 Les Cocottes de mon grand-père, 1884
 Miss Fauvette, 1894
 Fouterie de poète, 1903 Texte en ligne [archive]

Le volume Le Théâtre érotique français sous le Bas-Empire [archive] (Paris, Pincebourse) n'est pas de lui, c'est une supercherie (cf. Avant-propos du Théâtre érotique de la rue de la Santé, dans Jean-Jacques et Mathias Pauvert, Théâtre érotique français du xixe siècle, Paris, Sortilèges, 1994, p. 194 ; et Appendice II, notice de la vente d'un exemplaire comportant des pièces manuscrites, p. 625 : "Le nom d'Alfred Delvau, sur la réimpression de l'histoire du théâtre, en 1872, est faux et y a été mis uniquement parce que les œuvres de Delvau, à cette époque, faisaient fureur.")

References 
 René Fayt, Un aimable faubourien, Alfred Delvau (1825-1867), «  » et Émile Van Balberghe Librairie, 1999.
 François Gaudin, Maurice Lachâtre (1814-1900), portrait d'un éditeur et lexicographe socialiste, thèse de doctorat, 2 vol., Université Versailles-Saint-Quentin-en-Yvelines, 2004.

19th-century French writers
1825 births
1867 deaths
Journalists from Paris